Bulgaria took part in the Junior Eurovision Song Contest 2021 in Paris, France after an absence of four years. Their entrant was selected internally by the Bulgarian broadcaster Bulgarian National Television (BNT). Denislava and Martin represented Bulgaria in the contest and will perform the song "Voice of Love".

Background

Prior to the 2021 contest, Bulgaria had participated in the contest six times. In , the country made its debut with the group Bon-Bon and the song "" and finished 7th out of 17 entries with 86 points. One year later, when the competition was held in Cyprus, Bulgaria achieved their worst result to date. The nation ended up in last place (15th) with only 15 points. This was followed by the country's first withdrawal from the competition, which lasted 2 years. Bulgaria was forced to withdraw once again for another 2 years. Krisia, Hasan & Ibrahim were chosen as the Bulgarian entry with the song "Planet of the Children". The song achieved the best placement in the country in the history of the competition, achieving second place with 147 points; 12 points behind the winner Italy.

Before Junior Eurovision 

On 8 November 2021, BNT held a special press conference where it was announced that Denislava Dimitrova and Martin Stoyanov, both from Dobrich, Bulgaria, would represent Bulgaria at the contest with the song "Voice of Love". The song was presented on 13 November during the show The day begins with Georgi Lyubenov on BNT 1. It was written by Vasil Garvanliev, Davor Yordanovski, Vesna Malinova, and Stan Stefanov.

At Junior Eurovision
After the opening ceremony, which took place on 13 December 2021, it was announced that Bulgaria would perform sixth on 19 December 2021, following Italy and preceding Russia.

At the end of the contest, Bulgaria received 77 points, placing 16th out of 19 participating countries.

Voting

Detailed voting results

References 

Bulgaria
Junior
Junior Eurovision Song Contest